Peter Lewis Shinnie  (January 18, 1915 in London – July 9, 2007 in Calgary) was a British archaeologist and Africanist.

He was the author of Meroe - A Civilization of the Sudan (1967).

Works
 Medieval Nubia (1954)
 Excavations at Soba (1955)
 Ghazali, a monastery in the northern Sudan 1961, concerning the Monastery in Ghazali
 Meroë - A civilization of the Sudan (1967)
 The African Iron Age (1971)
 Debeira West, a mediaeval Nubian town (1978)
 The capital of Kush (1980)
 Archaeology of Gonja, Ghana : excavations at Daboya  (1989)
 Ancient Nubia (1995)
 Early Asante (1995)

Biography
 A personal memoir by P. L. Shinnie
 Reminiscences of an archeologist in the Sudan by P. L. Shinnie
 Peter Lewis Shinnie 1915-2007 by Nicholas David
 Peter Lewis Shinnie 1915-2007 by Krzysztof A. Grzymski

References 

Peter Shinnie bibliography

British archaeologists
1915 births
2007 deaths
British expatriates in Canada
20th-century archaeologists
Recipients of orders, decorations, and medals of Sudan